A , or CIR, is a participant on the JET Programme residing and working in Japan. Although responsibilities for a CIR vary according to his or her contracting organization, the majority of a CIR's time is spent organizing and assisting various projects related to adjusting Japanese society to an increasingly multilingual, multicultural, and international world. Many of these projects include but are not limited to: international exchange programmes, primary and secondary school visits, language classes, cooking classes, cultural lectures, as well as translating and interpreting. CIRs are employed throughout Japan at international exchange associations, prefectural offices, city halls, town halls, village halls, and boards of education.

JET is administered by Council of Local Authorities for International Relations (CLAIR) and funded by Ministry of Education, Culture, Sports, Science and Technology (MEXT).

Statistics
As of July 1, 2014, there were 364 CIRs, accounting for approximately 8.2% of the 4,465 JET Programme participants.

References

 Contracting Organisation ALT・CIR Placement Numbers (July 1, 2014) Pages 6-8

Further reading
 David L. McConnell, Importing Diversity: Inside Japan's JET Program (2000)
 Bruce Feiler, Learning to Bow: An American Teacher in a Japanese School (1991), later published as Learning to Bow: Inside the Heart of Japan (2004)

External links
 CIR Homepage - the official website for CIRs all over Japan (defunct as of April 1, 2015)
 National AJET - the Association for Japan Exchange and Teaching

Foreign relations of Japan
International relations